The 2018–19 season was the 117th season of competitive football in Italy.

Promotions and relegations (pre-season)
Teams promoted to Serie A
 Empoli
 Parma
 Frosinone

Teams relegated from Serie A
 Benevento
 Hellas Verona
 Crotone

Teams promoted to Serie B
 Livorno
 Padova
 Lecce
 Cosenza

Teams relegated from Serie B
 Virtus Entella
 Novara
 Ternana
 Pro Vercelli

National teams

Men

Italy national football team 

The previous season, on 13 November 2017, Italy failed to qualify for the 2018 FIFA World Cup after a 1–0 aggregate loss to Sweden for the first time since the 1958 FIFA World Cup.

Friendlies

2018–19 UEFA Nations League A

Group 3

UEFA Euro 2020 qualifying

Group J

Women

Friendlies

2019 FIFA Women's World Cup qualification (UEFA)

UEFA Group 6

Cyprus Women's Cup

Group B

Final

2019 FIFA Women's World Cup

Group C

Knockout stage

League season

Serie A

Serie B

Serie C

Serie D

Serie A (women)

Cup competitions

Coppa Italia

Final

Supercoppa Italiana

UEFA competitions

UEFA Champions League

Group stage

Group B

Group C

Group G

Group H

Knockout phase

Round of 16

|}

Quarter-finals

|}

UEFA Europa League

Qualifying phase and play-off round

Second qualifying round

|}

Third qualifying round

|}

Play-off round

|}

Group stage

Group F

Group H

Knockout phase

Round of 32

|}

Round of 16

|}

Quarter-finals

|}
Notes

UEFA Youth League

UEFA Champions League Path

Group B

Group C

Group G

Group H

Play-offs

|}

UEFA Women's Champions League

Knockout phase

Round of 32

|}

Round of 16

|}

References 

 
Seasons in Italian football
Football
Football
Italy
Italy
2018 sport-related lists